Alaeddine Marzouki (born 3 July 1990) is a Tunisian football winger who plays for Saudi Arabian club Al-Bukiryah.

References

1990 births
Living people
Tunisian footballers
Tunisia international footballers
Club Africain players
ES Hammam-Sousse players
Stade Tunisien players
CS Sfaxien players
Espérance Sportive de Tunis players
Al-Ain FC (Saudi Arabia) players
Al-Bukayriyah FC players
Association football wingers
Tunisian Ligue Professionnelle 1 players
Saudi First Division League players
Saudi Second Division players
Tunisian expatriate footballers
Expatriate footballers in Saudi Arabia
Tunisian expatriate sportspeople in Saudi Arabia

External links